Yumashevo is a rural locality (a selo) in and the administrative centre of Yumashevsky Selsoviet, Baymaksky District, Bashkortostan, Russia. The population was 1,006 as of 2010. There are 16  streets.

Geography 
Yumashevo is located 33 km west of Baymak (the district's administrative centre) by road. Saygafar is the nearest rural locality.

References 

Rural localities in Baymaksky District